Andy Park may refer to:

 Andy Park (musician) (born 1957), American musician, worship leader and author
 Andy Park (comics) (born 1975), Korean-American comic book artist, illustrator, and concept artist
 Andy Park (Mr. Christmas) (active from 1993), British electrician who claims to have celebrated Christmas Day every day since 1993
 Andy Parker (illustrator) (active 2005), British illustrator of children's books

See also
 Andrew Park (disambiguation)
 Park (disambiguation)
 Andy Parker (disambiguation)